Villeparisis–Mitry-le-Neuf is an RER station between Mitry-Mory and Villeparisis in northeast Paris, in Seine-et-Marne department, France. The station is in Zone 5 of the Carte orange. It is on the RER B suburban railway line.

External links

 

Railway stations in France opened in 1883
Railway stations in Seine-et-Marne
Réseau Express Régional stations